The House of Buddenbrock is the name of a Baltic German noble family of Hanseatic origin, whose members occupied significant positions in Prussia, Courland and Sweden.

History 
First written record of the Buddenbrock family dates back to 14th century. In 1620, the family members became part of Courland nobility, while in 1729, they became part of Swedish nobility. Henrik Magnus von Buddenbrock was awarded with the hereditary title of Baron in 1731 by King Frederick I of Sweden. The family was also awarded with the title of Baron in Prussia, by Frederick William II of Prussia. This title was recognized again on February 28, 1885 by William I, German Emperor.

Notable members 
Wilhelm Dietrich von Buddenbrock (1672–1757), Prussian cavalry leader
Henrik Magnus von Buddenbrock (1685–1743), Swedish baron and lieutenant general who was executed after the Battle of Villmanstrand
Gustav Freiherr von Buddenbrock, Prussian general

Swedish unintroduced nobility